Pearce v Mayfield Secondary School Governing Body and Advocate General for Scotland  v MacDonald [2003] UKHL 34; [2003] IRLR 512 is a UK labour law case concerning sexuality and sex discrimination. It was decided before the new Employment Equality (Sexual Orientation) Regulations 2003.

Facts
Pearce is a lesbian who was harassed by pupils for it. MacDonald was a gay pilot for the RAF, forced to resign after he came out. They both claimed they had been discriminated against on grounds of their sex.

Judgment
The Sex Discrimination Act 1975 does not cover sexuality discrimination. The Act was always meant to cover gender, not sexuality, and the comparators were gay people of the opposite sex. It was held that a gay man was the correct comparator for Pearce, and he would have been treated the same. Moreover, for the school, pupils were not agents, and so the school was not vicariously liable.

See also
UK employment discrimination law
UK labour law
Human Rights Act 1998

External links
Court of Appeal [2001] EWCA Civ 1347

United Kingdom labour case law
United Kingdom equality case law
House of Lords cases
2003 in case law
2003 in British law
2003 in LGBT history
United Kingdom LGBT rights case law